Yevhen Oleksandrovych Cheberyachko (born 19 June 1983) is a Ukrainian retired professional football defender.

Cheberyachko was part of the Ukraine national under-21 football team that was runner up of the 2006 UEFA European Under-21 Football Championship.

Honors
FC Dnipro Dnipropetrovsk
 UEFA Europa League: runner-up 2014–15

Ukraine under-21
 UEFA Under-21 Championship: runner-up 2006

External links 

Official Website Profile (Ukr)
Profile at FFU Site (Ukr)

1983 births
Living people
Footballers from Kyiv
Ukrainian footballers
Ukraine international footballers
Ukrainian Premier League players
FC Dynamo-3 Kyiv players
FC CSKA Kyiv players
FC Hoverla Uzhhorod players
FC Arsenal Kharkiv players
FC Kharkiv players
FC Dnipro players
SC Dnipro-1 players
Ukraine under-21 international footballers
Association football defenders